Sine'skwela (a portmanteau of the Filipino words Sine and Eskwela) was a Philippine children's television series produced by ABS-CBN Foundation (formerly ABS-CBN Lingkod Kapamilya Foundation), Science Education Institute of the Department of Science and Technology (DOST) and the Department of Education, Culture and Sports (DECS, now Department of Education or DepEd). The show aims to educate children about science. It was alternatively known as a School on Air.

Format
Sine'skwela is a curriculum-based show, in line with the science classes of public elementary students from Grade 2 to 6 in the Philippines. The Department of Education mandated that the show will be used as a reference for school classes and be screened at least once a week. The episodes does not only focus on basic library research but also on conducted laboratory experiments and field investigations.

Presentation
Sine'skwela simplified the complicated principles of science and technology by casting animated characters, dramatization and colorful visual effects. It also taught children the practical application of science in everyday life. Originally the show cast had been subsequently changed yearly on a basis during the run of the program, the original concept which runs on a segment-by-segment manner from 1994 till 1995 when the conceptualization of segments and scenarios of the script which now based on an academic approval from the Department of Education from 1996 the end of the run.

Cast

Regular cast
Jon Santos
Tom Taus
John Prats
Camille Prats
Antoinette Taus
Audie Gemora
Panjee Gonzalez as Ate Stella
Christine Bersola as Anatom
Brenan Espartinez as Agatom
Ding Lucina
Icko Gonzales as Kuya Bok
Sheena Ramos as Palikpik
Maan Munsayac as Kulitsap
Roobak Valle as Ugat-Puno
Kjell Villamarin
Allyzon Lualhati
Giselle Sanchez
Winnie Cordero  as Teacher Wackee / Ate Winnie
Agatha Tapan as Mai-Mai 
Ricardo Flores as Migo
BJ Rodriguez
John Wayne Sace as Emilio
Soliman Cruz as Mang Anding
Hazel Ann Mendoza as Hazel
Gerard Pizarras as Kuya Joel
Bryan Homecillo as Elvis
Lovely Rivero
Tado Jimenez
Shiela May Junsay as Binhi
John Manalo as Pepe
Bombi Plata as Buhawi

Guest cast
Julius Babao
Joji Isla
Lou Veloso
Lester Llansang
Carlo Aquino
Archie Adamos
Marc Solis
Mon Ilagan
Gus Abelgas
Erwin Tulfo
Jao Mapa
Empoy Marquez
Bob dela Cruz as Mang Tomas - "Avian Flu" episode (2007)
Kim Atienza
Bodjie Pascua

Production
The Sine'skwela Creative Committee made the concept for the television series in 1993. The committee was composed of an executive producer, a science research coordinator, a head writer, and consultants from the Department of Education, Culture and Sports (DECS, later became the Department of Education or DepEd), the Department of Science and Technology (DOST) and the University of the Philippines Institute for Science and Mathematics Education Development (UP ISMED). There are five stages in the process of producing an episode. Sine'skwela was first aired on June 13, 1994, and its success led to the production of similar educational shows such as Hiraya Manawari, Math-Tinik, Epol/Apple and Bayani. Sine'skwela aired its final episode in 2004.

Re-runs
Beginning on March 28, 2020, the show's episodes were rerun on ABS-CBN as part of the programming change the network made due to the COVID-19 pandemic in the Philippines.

Accolades
Sine'skwela was awarded the Priz de Jeunesse at the 20th Television Science Programme in Paris, France in 2003. The winning episode is directed by John Red. The episode is about the Pasig River and its degradation and how human activity contributes to it.

References

1994 Philippine television series debuts
2004 Philippine television series endings
1990s Philippine television series
ABS-CBN original programming
Children's education television series
Filipino-language television shows
Philippine children's television series
Philippine educational television series
Science education television series